The following are people who were either born/raised or have lived for a significant period of time in Lesotho.

 Bokang Phelane, film and television actress
 Lekunutu Tseounyane (born 1983), footballer who currently plays as a goalkeeper
 Lengana Nkhethoa (born 1978), footballer who currently plays as a defender
 Lire Phiri, footballer who currently plays as a midfielder
 Mochini Matete, footballer 
 Mohapi Ntobo (born 1984), footballer who currently plays as a defender
 Moitheri Ntobo (born 1979), footballer
 Mokheti Matsora, footballer who currently plays as a striker
 Mokone Marabe, footballer who currently plays as a striker
 Molefe Lekoekoe, footballer who plays as a midfielder
 Moli Lesesa (born 1984), footballer who currently plays as a midfielder
 Mosito Lehata, athlete primarily known as a 100-meter runner
 Sheila Khala, poet
 Motheo Mohapi (born 1968), former footballer who played as a midfielder
 Motlalepula Mofolo (born 1986), footballer
 Motlatsi Maseela (born 1971), former footballer who played as a defender
 Mpitsa Marai (born 1980), retired footballer and coach
 Neo Makama (born 1981), footballer who plays as a striker
 Nkau Lerotholi, footballer who plays as a defender
 Nyakhane Nyakhane, footballer who currently plays as a midfielder
 Taeli Ramashalane, footballer
 Tatolo Mphuthing (born 1979), footballer who currently plays as a midfielder
 Teele Nts'onyana (born 1970), former footballer who played as a striker
 Thabane Rankara (born 1978), footballer
 Thabiso Maile (born 1987), footballer who plays as a defender 
 Thabo Masualle (born 1982), footballer who currently plays as a defender
 Thapelo Mokhele (born 1986), footballer defender
 Thapelo Tale (born 1988), striker
 Tsoloane Mosakeng (born 1977), footballer who currently plays as a midfielder

Lesotho people
Lesotho